Clifford Severn (September 21, 1925 – June 4, 2014) was an American cricketer and child screen actor.

Clifford Severn was the son of Dr. Clifford Brill Severn (1890-1981). His parents emigrated from South Africa to Los Angeles after he was born. He had seven siblings who were all child actors: Venetia Severn, Yvonne Severn, Raymond Severn, Ernest Severn, Christopher Severn, William Severn and Winston Severn. He died in Los Angeles in 2014 at age 88.

Like his brothers Winston and Raymond, Clifford Severn played for the US national cricket team.

As Clifford Severn (in 1940 films as Clifford Severn Jr), he appeared notably in the films A Christmas Carol and the war film They Live in Fear.

Filmography

References

External links
 

1925 births
2014 deaths
American male child actors
American male film actors
American cricketers
South African emigrants to the United States
Cricketers from Johannesburg
20th-century American actors
Cricketers from Los Angeles